The People's Power Party (abbreviation: PPP) is an opposition  political party in Singapore.

History and political development
The party was first formed by veteran politician Goh Meng Seng, on 16 July 2015, just a few months prior to the election held that year. Goh had previously served as a member of the incumbent opposition Workers' Party of Singapore and National Solidarity Party, in the 2006 and 2011, respectively. In the aftermath of the 2011 election, Goh resigned from his Secretary General post as well as his party membership following the party's defeat.

The party was perceived as lightweight and opposed to major opposition parties were believed to be reasons for its speedy registration approval being given in two instead of the typical three months set by the Election Department.

The party only contested in the Chua Chu Kang Group Representation Constituency, a four-member GRC, which the team consist of Goh, and candidates Lee Tze Shih, Low Wai Choo and former NSP member Syafarin Sarif, faced against the ruling People's Action Party team led by Health Minister Gan Kim Yong, Parliamentary Secretary and Mayor Low Yen Ling, Zaqy Mohamad and newcomer Yee Chia Hsing. The PAP team defeated the party with a vote share of 76.83%-23.11%, which was 84,731 and 25,460 votes, respectively. Low was notable for being convicted for public nuisance for her role in a Hong Lim Park protest rally in 2014, while Lee Tze Shih joined Progress Singapore Party in 2019.

Goh, despite being a veteran politician who was surprised of the number of voters that voted for them, as he claimed that his party lacked media coverage, he and his team's defeat was one of the worst performing candidates in this election. Goh shortly returned to Hong Kong to reside with his family after the election.

In 2018, the party was along with the six other opposition parties (Democratic Progressive Party, National Solidarity Party, Reform Party, Singapore Democratic Party, Singaporeans First and Singapore's Voice Party, a party formed by NSP chief Lim Tean) led by former People's Action Party member and presidential candidate Tan Cheng Bock, on the possibility of forming a coalition for the next election.

The party participated in the 2020 election, but Goh was the only candidate fielded this election, this time contesting in the MacPherson SMC. On 27 June, Goh confirmed that this was his final election, reiterating his belief that he could contribute more to Parliament as an opposition member if elected, while praising the incumbent Tin Pei Ling for her involvement. Despite the efforts, it was all for naught, as Goh was defeated to Tin by a 71.74%-28.26% vote share.

Objectives and policies

PPP advocates the Separation of Five Powers (including Social, Culture, Politics, Economics) and a more balanced development of Singapore.

The PPP has adopted and adapted with the Three Principles of the People and its system of having five branches of government espoused by Dr Sun Yat-Sen, founding father of the Republic of China (now administrating Taiwan and surrounding Island).  It has modified the concepts of the Five Powers to stay relevant to modern contemporary political and social structures. The emphasis is on the separation of the Five Powers which means the separation of certain institutions from Executive branch's control.

The Power of Impeachment (originally under Control Yuan) has been expanded to include various contemporary functional government institutions. Examples: Corrupt Practices Investigation Bureau, advocacy of Ombudsman Commission, Equal Opportunity Commission, Free Press and Freedom of Expression.

The Power of Examination has been adapted and modified to modern concept of Selection for both political leaders as well as civil servants. This involves institutions like Elections Department and Public Service Commission.

PPP advocates that the institutions that fall under these two powers, namely Power of Impeachment and Power of Selection, be placed under the supervision of Singapore's Elected President, a separate branch of government.

PPP has also called for the introduction of a minimum wage in Singapore.

Leadership
PPP's leader is its Secretary-General, Goh Meng Seng. Goh, a veteran opposition politician, who previously contested Tampines GRC in the 2011 General Elections when he was leading the National Solidarity Party. He also contested Aljunied GRC with Sylvia Lim, James Gomez and two others in the 2006 General Elections when he was with the Workers’ Party.

Central executive committee as at 5 December 2015:

 Chairman: Syafarin Sarif
 Secretary-General: Goh Meng Seng
 Assistant Secretary-General: Muhamad Faizal Razali
 Treasurer: Nazryn Azhar Samat
 Organizing Secretary: Goh Toh Mui
 Other Members:
 Tan Peng Swee
 Peh Siew Choo
 Thamilselvan Karuppaya

Footnote: Vice-Chairman Sivakumaran Chellappa (also Head of Policy Research) and Organizing Secretary Augustine Lee left PPP in 2019 to join Peoples Voice and Progress Singapore Party respectively. Lee Wai Leng resigned as Head of Media Team in 2016 and subsequently left PPP in April 2020.

Leadership of People's Power Party

Electoral performance

References

2015 establishments in Singapore
Democratic socialist parties in Asia
Political parties established in 2015
Political parties in Singapore
Socialist parties in Singapore